Ignatius Arnoz,M.H.M.  (1 April 1885 – 26 February 1950) was a Czech prelate of the Roman Catholic Church.

Ignatius Arnoz was born in Bodenbach, Bohemia, and ordained a priest on 25 July 1910 from the religious order of the Mill Hill Missionaries. In 1931 he was appointed Senior of the then Mission "Sui Iuris" of Bulawayo. Arnoz rose to Prefect and Vicar Apostolic as the mission was elevated. He was ordained bishop in 1937.

See also
Archdiocese of Bulawayo

External links
Catholic-Hierarchy
 Bulawayo Diocese

Rhodesian Roman Catholic bishops
20th-century Czech Roman Catholic priests
1885 births
1950 deaths
People from Děčín
Roman Catholic bishops of Bulawayo